Simeon Castille (born October 12, 1985) is a former American football cornerback. He owns and operates Stille Academy a training facility in Pelham, Alabama.

He was a highschool All-American and State Champion at Briarwood Christian School. He played college football at Alabama. He was signed by the Cincinnati Bengals as an undrafted free agent in 2008.

He has also been a member of the San Diego Chargers, Florida Tuskers and Minnesota Vikings.

On February 3, 2014, Castille was traded to the San Jose SaberCats in exchange for Quentin Sims, Andre Freeman and Syd'Quan Thompson.

Personal life
His father, Jeremiah, and brother, Tim, also played football in the NFL after attending Alabama. He married his wife Raquel Castille on August 14, 2018. They have three children: Simeon, Israel, and Selah. They attend and are active members of Church of the Highlands in Birmingham, AL. He opened Stille Academy in 2020. He will be starring in The American Underdog movie playing Isaac Bruce which premieres in December 2021.

Simeon's brother, Caleb Castille, is an actor who starred in the movie Woodlawn and is a member of the cast of the TV Series NCIS: Los Angeles.

References

External links

 https://stilleacademy.com/

1985 births
Living people
People from Phenix City, Alabama
Players of American football from Birmingham, Alabama
American football cornerbacks
Alabama Crimson Tide football players
Cincinnati Bengals players
San Diego Chargers players
Florida Tuskers players
Minnesota Vikings players
Orlando Predators players
San Jose SaberCats players